Košarkaški klub Križevci, also known as KK Prigorje Financije for sponsorship reasons, is a professional basketball club based in Križevci, Croatia. It competes in the Croatian League.

History
The club was founded in 2008 by a group of basketball enthusiast unsatisfied with functioning of KK Radnik Križevci, basketball club that was once one of the best in Croatia. So they decided to form their own club and in only three seasons they have managed to qualify for Croatian first league.

External links
Official Website

Križevci
Basketball teams in Croatia
Basketball teams established in 2008
2008 establishments in Croatia